German Sport University Cologne (German: Deutsche Sporthochschule Köln, DSHS, Spoho),  is a sport university in Cologne, Germany.

History 
The Sport University Cologne was founded in 1947. After the Sport University had changed its name to "German Sport University" in 1965 it gained the official status as a university in 1970. After German reunification, the East German "Deutsche Hochschule für Körperkultur" (German University for body culture) Leipzig was dissolved, leaving the Sport University Cologne as the only one in Germany.

Rankings 

In the Shanghai Ranking's 2020 Global Ranking of Sport Science Schools and Departments, the German Sport University Cologne is ranked 17th in the world and 1st in Germany.

See also 
 European College of Sport Science

References

External links

Official website

Educational institutions established in 1947
Universities and colleges in Cologne
Sports science
Sport in Cologne
Lindenthal, Cologne
1947 establishments in Germany
Sports universities and colleges